Léa Fazer (born 20 April 1965) is a Swiss film director, screenwriter and actress. She studied film at the University Paris Diderot. Her film Bienvenue en Suisse was screened in the Un Certain Regard section at the 2004 Cannes Film Festival.

Filmography

References

External links

1965 births
Living people
Swiss film directors
Swiss women film directors
Swiss screenwriters
Swiss film actresses
Film people from Geneva